Birdz may refer to:

 Birdz (rapper) (born 1990), an Indigenous Australian rapper and record producer
 Birdz (TV series), a Canadian animated series broadcast from 1998 until 1999
 "Birdz", a song by Denzel Curry featuring Rick Ross from the 2019 album Zuu

See also
 Birds (disambiguation)